Tianhe Stadium  is a multi-purpose stadium in Tianhe District, Guangzhou, Guangdong, China. It is currently used for football matches.

History 
Construction of the stadium began on 4 July 1984 at the former site of Guangzhou Tianhe Airport. It was opened in August 1987 for the 1987 National Games of China. It hosted the final of the inaugural FIFA Women's World Cup in 1991. The stadium has hosted the home matches of local football team Guangzhou since 2011. In February 2016, the club obtained the operating rights of the stadium from Guangzhou Sports Bureau for the next twenty years.

The stadium hosted the football finals of the 2010 Asian Games and the final match of the AFC Champions League twice, in 2013 and 2015.

Transport 
The stadium is best reached by taking Guangzhou Metro Line 1 to Tianhe Sports Center Station (East Gate), Line 3 to Linhexi Station (North Gate) and Line 1 or 3 to Tiyu Xilu Station (West Gate and South Gate).

References

External links 
 Stadium picture

Football venues in Guangzhou
Rugby union stadiums in China
1991 FIFA Women's World Cup stadiums
Venues of the 2010 Asian Games
Tianhe District
Multi-purpose stadiums in China
Sports venues completed in 1987
1987 establishments in China